Dibble Glacier in Antarctica is a prominent channel glacier flowing from the continental ice and terminating in a prominent tongue at the east side of Davis Bay. It was delineated from air photos taken by U.S. Navy Operation Highjump (1946–47), and named by the Advisory Committee on Antarctic Names for Jonas Dibble, ship's carpenter on the sloop Peacock of the United States Exploring Expedition (1838–42) under Charles Wilkes. Dibble is credited with leaving his sick bed and working 24 hours without relief with other carpenters to repair a broken rudder on the Peacock, when the ship was partially crushed in an ice bay in 151°19′E and forced to retire northward.

Important Bird Area
A 500 ha site on fast ice about 5 km from the north-eastern margin of the glacier has been designated an Important Bird Area (IBA) by BirdLife International because it supports a breeding colony of emperor penguins, with an estimate of some 12,500 individuals based on 2009 satellite imagery.

See also
 List of glaciers in the Antarctic
 Glaciology

References

External links 

Important Bird Areas of Antarctica
Penguin colonies
Glaciers of Wilkes Land